Vulcanophilus is a genus of ground beetles in the family Carabidae. This genus has a single species, Vulcanophilus calathoides. It is found in Indonesia.

References

Platyninae